COBRAcable (COpenhagen-BRussels-Amsterdam cable) is a ±320 kV, 700 MW HVDC submarine power cable pair between Eemshaven, the Netherlands and Endrup near Esbjerg, Denmark. The cable is jointly owned by Energinet.dk and TenneT. Its purpose is to improve the European transmission grid and thus increase the amount of variable wind power in the system while improving supply reliability. Its 700 MW capacity corresponds to an annual transmission capacity of 6.1 TWh.

Construction
The connection has been designed in such a way as to enable the connection of an offshore wind farm at a later stage. This contributes to the realisation of a sustainable international energy landscape, a key aim of the European Union.

The building itself has a footprint of 125 m × 36 m and a height of 21 m. A group of local residents have collaborated with Energinet.dk in deciding the outer appearance of the building and its surrounding vegetation.

The COBRAcable is a cross-border project of European significance. The European Commission has therefore allocated a subsidy to the project under the EU Economic Recovery Plan, and has designated the COBRAcable as a Project of Common Interest (PCI). In November 2015, the project was put on the EU "Projects of Common Interest" list, along with Viking Link between Denmark and England, and Kriegers Flak Combined Grid Solution between Denmark and Germany.

Construction contracts were signed with Siemens and Prysmian in 2016 and in June 2016 Prysmian subcontracted the marine survey for the cable placement to the Swedish marine survey provider MMT.

Onshore construction started in Denmark in October 2016 and in the Netherlands in January 2017.

In 2015 COBRACable was expected to be operational from early 2019, in Q1 2019 commercial operation was expected to start during Q3 of 2019.

Operation
After tests between July and September 2019, the COBRAcable was commissioned in September 2019. In its first half year of operation, it had a 79% capacity factor and transported 1,400 GWh to Netherlands and 700 GWh to Denmark. It became inoperable in September 2020 due to a cable fault, and became operational in January 2021 after repairs.

See also
 Electricity sector in Denmark
 Electricity sector in the Netherlands
 Skagerrak, 1,500 MW cable between West Denmark and Norway
 Konti-Skan, cable between West Denmark and Sweden
 BritNed, cable between the Netherlands and the United Kingdom
 NorNed, cable between the Netherlands and Norway
 Viking Link, cable under construction between Denmark and the United Kingdom
 Through Great Belt Power Link; Kontek, cable between East Denmark and east Germany

References

External links

 4c page

HVDC transmission lines
Electric power infrastructure in Denmark
Electric power infrastructure in the Netherlands
Electric power transmission systems
Electrical interconnectors in the North Sea
2019 establishments in Denmark
2019 establishments in the Netherlands
Energy infrastructure completed in 2019